Jaden Shackelford (born February 14, 2001) is an American professional basketball player for the Oklahoma City Blue of the NBA G League. He previously played for the Alabama Crimson Tide.

High school career
In his first two years of high school, Shackelford attended Oak Hills High School in Oak Hills, California. For his junior season, he transferred to Hesperia High School in Hesperia, California. Shackelford averaged 34 points, 11 rebounds, 5.5 assists and four steals per game as a senior. He was named Mojave River League MVP and Daily Press Basketball Athlete of the Year. He committed to playing college basketball for Alabama over offers from Kansas State, Pepperdine and UNLV, among others.

College career
On February 12, 2020, Shackelford matched his freshman season-high of 28 points, with eight rebounds and seven three-pointers, in a 95–91 loss to Auburn in overtime. Six days later, he was named USBWA National Freshman of the Week. As a freshman, Shackelford averaged 15 points and 4.5 rebounds per game, earning SEC All-Freshman Team honors. He averaged 14 points, 3.8 rebounds, and 2 assists per game as a sophomore. Shackelford was named to the Second Team All-SEC. Following the season he entered the 2021 NBA draft without hiring an agent, and also entered the transfer portal. Shackelford decided to return to Alabama in July 2021. On February 9, 2022, he posted career-highs of 30 points and eight 3-pointers in a 97–83 win over Ole Miss. Shackelford was named to the Second Team All-SEC as a junior after averaging 16.6 points and 5.4 rebounds per game.

On April 3, 2022, Shackelford declared for the 2022 NBA draft, forgoing his remaining college eligibility.

Professional career

Oklahoma City Blue (2022–present)
After going undrafted in the 2022 NBA draft, Shackelford signed an Exhibit 10 contract with the Oklahoma City Thunder on June 24, 2022. On November 3, 2022, Shackelford was named to the opening night roster for the Oklahoma City Blue.

Career statistics

College

|-
| style="text-align:left;"| 2019–20
| style="text-align:left;"| Alabama
| 31 || 19 || 29.4 || .413 || .357 || .768 || 4.5 || 1.4 || .5 || .2 || 15.0
|-
| style="text-align:left;"| 2020–21
| style="text-align:left;"| Alabama
| style="background:#cfecec;"|33* || 32 || 29.3 || .410 || .342 || .756 || 3.8 || 2.0 || .8 || .1 || 14.0
|- class="sortbottom"
| style="text-align:center;" colspan="2"| Career
| 64 || 51 || 29.4 || .411 || .351 || .762 || 4.1 || 1.7 || .7 || .1 || 14.5

Personal life
Shackelford's father, Anthony, a youth mentor at Abundant Living Family Church. Shackelford is of African American and Dutch descent. Shackelford is often mistaken for his relation to Dale Gribble due to his  alias.

References

External links
Alabama Crimson Tide bio

2001 births
Living people
African-American basketball players
Alabama Crimson Tide men's basketball players
American men's basketball players
American people of Dutch descent
Basketball players from California
People from Hesperia, California
Point guards
Shooting guards
21st-century African-American sportspeople